The Wasp class is a class of landing helicopter dock (LHD) amphibious assault ships operated by the United States Navy. All Wasp-class ships were built by Ingalls Shipbuilding, at Pascagoula, Mississippi, with the lead ship, commissioned on 29 July 1989.

Design
The Wasp class is based on the preceding  design. The design was modified to allow for the operation of AV-8B Harrier II aircraft and Landing Craft Air Cushion (LCAC) hovercraft, making the Wasp class the first ships specifically designed to operate these.

For propulsion, most of the ships are fitted with two steam boilers connected to geared turbines, which deliver  to the two propeller shafts. The last ship of the class, was instead fitted with two General Electric LM2500 geared gas turbines. The ship's company consists of 1,208 personnel.

Amphibious operations
The LHDs can support amphibious landings in two forms: by landing craft and by helicopter. The flight deck has nine helicopter landing spots and can operate helicopters and tiltrotors as large as the Sikorsky CH-53E Super Stallion and MV-22B Osprey. The size of the air combat element varies depending on the operation: a standard air combat element consists of six Harriers or six F-35B Lightning IIs and four AH-1W/Z Super Cobra/Viper attack helicopters for attack and support, twelve Ospreys and four Super Stallions for transport, and three or four Bell UH-1Y Venom utility helicopters. For a full assault, the air group can have a maximum of 22 Ospreys, while a Wasp operating in the sea control or "Harrier carrier" or "Lightning carrier" configuration carries 20 AV-8Bs or F-35Bs (though some ships of the class have operated as many as 24 Harriers), supported by 6 Sikorsky SH-60 Seahawk helicopters for anti-submarine warfare. Two aircraft elevators move aircraft between the flight deck and the hangar; in order to transit the Panama Canal, these elevators need to be folded in.

Each ship is capable of hosting 1,894 personnel of the United States Marine Corps; almost the full strength of a marine expeditionary unit (MEU). A six-track internal monorail system and six  internal elevators are used to shift cargo from the cargo holds to landing craft in the well deck.

Each Wasp-class ship has a hospital with 64 patient beds and 6 operating rooms. An additional 536 beds can be set up in an overflow casualty ward as needed.

Armament and sensors

The armament of the first four Wasp class consists of two Mark 29 octuple launchers for RIM-7 Sea Sparrow missiles, two Mark 49 launchers for RIM-116 Rolling Airframe Missiles, three 20 mm Phalanx CIWSs, four 25 mm Mark 38 chain gun systems, and four .50 caliber machine guns.

Countermeasures fitted to the ships include four to six Mark 36 SRBOC chaff and decoy launchers, an AN/SLQ-25 torpedo decoy, AN/SLQ-49 chaff buoys, a Sea Gnat missile decoy, and an AN/SLQ-32 Electronic Warfare Suite.

The sensor suite fitted to each ship comprises an AN/SPS-48 or AN/SPS-52 air-search radar backed up by an AN/SPS-49 air-search radar, an SPS-67 surface search radar, an AN/URN-25 TACAN system, along with several additional radars for navigation and fire control.

Construction
All Wasp-class ships were built by Ingalls Shipbuilding, at Pascagoula, Mississippi. The first ship of the class, was commissioned on 29 July 1989.

The fifth ship of the class, was constructed through a process of modular assembly and prefitting out, which meant that the LHD was almost 75 percent complete when she was launched. Bataan was also the first LHD that was purpose built to house female crew members (as opposed to being modified after completion), with dedicated berths for up to 450 female sailors or Marines.

Japanese Defense Minister Itsunori Onodera in 2014 suggested that Japan purchase at least one Wasp-class ship to provide robust defensive amphibious capability for Japanese outer islands in the face of Chinese threats.

Ships in class

References

Citations

Bibliography

External links

 Extensive information on GlobalSecurity.org
 Seaforces.org

 

 Wasp class amphibious assault ship
Amphibious warfare vessel classes
 Wasp class amphibious assault ship